Brave New Girl may refer to:

 Brave New Girl (novel), a novel by Louisa Luna
 "Brave New Girl", a song by Britney Spears from In the Zone
 Brave New Girl, a 2004 TV movie adapted from the novel A Mother's Gift by Britney and Lynne Spears
 Brave New Girls, a Canadian television reality series which premiered in 2014

See also
 New Girl (disambiguation)